Bullapur is a village located in Davangere district of Karnataka state, India.

Villages in Davanagere district